The surname Negro may refer to:

Alfonso Negro (1915-1984), American-born Italian footballer
Benedikt Negro, German mime, clown and actor best known for his lead performance in Cirque du Soleil's O
Fred Negro (born 1959), Australian satirist and musician
Maikol Negro (born 1988), Italian footballer
Paolo Negro (born 1972), Italian footballer and manager

See also
Del Negro, a surname

Italian-language surnames
Spanish-language surnames